Eastedge is an unincorporated community in Barnes County, North Dakota, United States. By the 1960s, the town was almost completely abandoned. Today, only two homes and the remnants of a railroad loading dock remain.

References

Unincorporated communities in Barnes County, North Dakota
Unincorporated communities in North Dakota